Anton Pauschenwein (born 24 January 1981) is an Austrian former professional association footballer, who played for SV Mattersburg. He played as a defender.

References

1981 births
Living people
People from Eisenstadt
Austrian footballers
Association football defenders
SV Mattersburg players
Footballers from Burgenland